Yayladamı can refer to:

 Yayladamı, Adıyaman
 Yayladamı, Kemaliye